("Cinderella, or Goodness Triumphant") is an operatic  in two acts by Gioachino Rossini. All these operas are versions of the fairy tale Cendrillon by Charles Perrault. Rossini's opera was first performed in Rome's Teatro Valle on 25 January 1817.

Rossini composed  when he was 25 years old, following the success of The Barber of Seville the year before. , which he completed in a period of three weeks, is considered to have some of his finest writing for solo voice and ensembles. The facsimile edition of the autograph has a different aria for Alidoro, ""; this seems to have been added by an anonymous hand for an 1818 production. For an 1820 revival in Rome, Rossini wrote a bravura replacement, "".

Composition history 
According to the account given by librettist Jacopo Ferretti, the genesis of this work – whose literary and musical aspects were both created with surprising speed – began in December 1816. Rossini was in Rome and tasked with writing a new opera for the Teatro Valle, to be staged on Saint Stephen's Day. An existing libretto, Francesca di Foix, had unexpectedly been vetoed by the papal censor, leaving no time to amend the text so that it might satisfy all parties involved (censorship, impresario, and authors). A replacement would have to be found.

Ferretti, despite harboring some ill-will against Rossini (the maestro had refused a libretto of his for The Barber of Seville), nonetheless met with the composer and the impresario Cartoni and agreed to join the project. However, when he began to suggest topics for the new work, one after another was rejected: too serious for the Carnival season in which the opera would premiere; too frivolous; too expensive and difficult to stage. Ferretti proposed more than two dozen subjects without success.

Finally, between yawns, and with Rossini half asleep on a sofa, the poet mentioned Cinderella. At this, Rossini roused himself sufficiently to challenge Ferretti on whether he dared write a libretto for the tale; Ferretti retorted with a dare for Rossini to clothe it in music. Rossini then asked the librettist if he had some verses ready to start working on. Ferretti replied, "despite my tiredness, tomorrow morning!" The composer nodded, wrapped himself in his clothes, and fell asleep.

Ferretti worked through the night and had the first parts of the work ready as promised in the morning. He finished the libretto in twenty-two days of breakneck work, and Rossini completed the score in an equally hectic twenty-four days. The poet had serious doubts about the success of this opera; Rossini, on the other hand, predicted that it would conquer Italy in a year and spread to France and England in another: "the impresarios will fight for staging it, as well as the prima donnas for being able to sing it".

La Cenerentola premiered on 25 January 1817, and quickly gained popularity both in Italy and internationally, despite a cold initial reception by the critics. In short, Rossini's prediction came entirely true, and Cenerentola soon overshadowed even Barber throughout the nineteenth century. Nonetheless, the collaboration between composer and librettist got no easier, and Ferretti wrote only one more libretto for Rossini, Matilde di Shabran, in 1821.

Performance history
19th century

At the first performance, the opera was received with some hostility, but it soon became popular throughout Italy and beyond; it reached Lisbon in 1819, London in 1820 and New York in 1826. Throughout most of the 19th century, its popularity rivalled that of Barber, but as the coloratura contralto, for which the leading role was originally written, became rare, it fell slowly out of the repertoire.

20th century and beyond

In the years following Glyndebourne Festival's celebrated 1952 revival, conducted by Vittorio Gui, and recorded for LP by EMI, Rossini's work enjoyed a renaissance, and a new generation of Rossini mezzo-sopranos ensured that La Cenerentola would once again be heard around the world. The opera is now considered a staple of the standard repertoire.

Roles

Synopsis
In this variation of the fairy tale, the wicked stepmother is replaced by a stepfather, Don Magnifico. The Fairy Godmother is replaced by Alidoro, a philosopher and tutor to the Prince. Cinderella is identified not by a glass slipper but by her bracelet. The supernatural elements that traditionally characterize the Cinderella story were removed from the libretto simply for ease of staging.
Time: Late 18th century – early 19th century
Place: Salerno (Italy)

Act 1

Angelina, known to her stepfather and stepsisters as "Cenerentola," is forced to serve as the maid in her own home. She sings of a king who married a common girl chosen for her kindness against the beauty and adornment of her competitresses ("Una volta c’era un rè"). A beggar arrives; her stepsisters, Clorinda and Tisbe, want to send him away, but Cenerentola gives him bread and coffee. Courtiers follow, announcing that Prince Ramiro will visit while he searches for the most beautiful girl in the land to wed. Cenerentola's stepfather, Don Magnifico, hopes to use this as an opportunity to save his own failing fortune.

When the room is empty, Ramiro enters alone, disguised as a valet. The "beggar" – in fact, his tutor, Alidoro – has informed him of a goodhearted young woman spotted here. Ramiro intends to find her incognito. Cenerentola returns, and she and Ramiro are attracted to each other (duet: "Un soave non-so che"), but when he asks who she is, she is overwhelmed and flees.

Finally, the "prince" arrives – the real valet, Dandini, who has taken his master's place – and Magnifico, Clorinda, and Tisbe fall over themselves to flatter him. He invites the family to a ball that evening, where he plans to find his bride; Cenerentola asks to join them, but Magnifico refuses (quintet: "Signor, una parola"). This callousness isn't lost on Ramiro. Alidoro returns to inquire after a third daughter in the house; Magnifico claims she has died and stealthily threatens to murder Cenerentola if she reveals herself. Left alone with Cenerentola, Alidoro promises to take her to the ball himself and that God will reward her kindness ("Là del ciel nell’arcano profondo").

The prince and his valet have retired to Ramiro's country house in some confusion, as neither of Magnifico's daughters resembled the worthy bride Alidoro had described. When Clorinda and Tisbe arrive, Dandini gives them a little test: he offers his "valet" to whichever sister the "prince" does not marry. The ladies are outraged at the idea of marrying a servant. Alidoro then arrives with a beautiful, unknown lady who strangely resembles Cenerentola. Unable to make sense of the situation, they all sit down to supper, feeling like they are in a dream.

Act 2

Magnifico frets over the competition his daughters now face from the strange lady ("Sia qualunque delle figlie"), but Cenerentola isn't interested in the "prince," saying she's fallen in love with his servant. An overjoyed Ramiro steps forward; however, Cenerentola tells him that she's going home and doesn't want him to follow her. If he really cares for her, she says, he will find her, giving him one of a matching pair of bracelets. The prince determines to do exactly that ("Sì, ritrovarla io giuro").

Meanwhile, Magnifico confronts the disguised Dandini, insisting that he choose one of his daughters to marry. Dandini tries to stall but is forced to admit that he's actually the valet and not the prince at all (duet: "Un segreto d’importanza").

A furious Magnifico and his daughters return home, where they order Cenerentola, back in rags, to serve them. A storm is thundering outside. Alidoro sabotages Ramiro's carriage so that it breaks down in front of Magnifico's manor, forcing the prince to take refuge within. Ramiro recognizes Cenerentola's bracelet on her right arm; the others comment on the situation (sextet: "Siete voi?"). When Ramiro threatens Cenerentola's recalcitrant family, she asks him to forgive them.

Ramiro and Cenerentola are married and celebrate their wedding at the palace. Magnifico tries to win the new princess's favor, but she asks only to be acknowledged, at last, as his daughter. She reflects on the misfortune to which she was born and the sudden reversal of her fate, then forgives her family for all her past unhappiness, adding that her days of sitting sadly by the fire are over ("Nacqui all'affanno... Non più mesta"). Everyone present acknowledges that she truly is worthy of the throne.

Noted arias
 "" – Don Magnifico in act 1
 "" – Dandini in act 1
 "" – Ramiro, Dandini in act 1
 "" – Ramiro in act 2
 "" – Ensemble in act 2
 "" – Angelina in act 2

Recordings

References
Notes

Sources
Gossett, Philip; Brauner, Patricia (2001), " La Cenerentola " in Holden, Amanda (ed.), The New Penguin Opera Guide, New York: Penguin Putnam. 
Osborne, Charles (1994), The Bel Canto Operas of Rossini, Donizetti, and Bellini, London: Methuen; Portland, Oregon: Amadeus Press. 
Osborne, Richard (1990), Rossini, Ithaca, New York: Northeastern University Press. 
Osborne, Richard (1998), "La Cenerentola", in Stanley Sadie, (ed.), The New Grove Dictionary of Opera, vol. 1. pp. 799–801. London: Macmillan.

External links

 
 Libretto from Stanford University, in Italian only
 Piano/vocal score
 Synopsis of La Cenerentola (Metropolitan Opera)
 La Cenerentola: online opera guide and synopsis

Operas by Gioachino Rossini
Italian-language operas
Drammi giocosi
Opera semiseria
Works based on Cinderella
Operas based on works by Charles Perrault
1817 operas
Operas
Operas set in Italy
Operas based on fairy tales